Bekanty Victorien Angban (born 29 September 1996) is an Ivorian professional footballer who plays as a defensive midfielder for Russian club Sochi.

Club career

Chelsea
In 2012, Angban joined Chelsea from Stade d'Abidjan as a trialist. He only officially signed for Chelsea in 2015, after he was able to obtain a work permit after spending three years in the country.

Loan to Sint-Truiden
On 14 July 2015, it was announced that Angban would spend the season on loan at Belgian club Sint-Truiden. On 24 July 2015, he made his professional debut as a 64th-minute substitute in a 2–1 victory over Club Brugge in their first game of the season. Angban made his first start for the team on 8 August, against K.V. Oostende which ended in a 1–1 draw. On 27 September 2015, Angban was sent off in the 79th minute, in a 1–0 loss against Anderlecht. On 29 January 2016, he was again sent off in a match against Anderlecht in the closing minutes of a 2–1 loss. On 5 March 2016, Angban was sent off for the third time, then in a match against Club Brugge after picking up two yellows; the match ended in a 3–0 loss for Sint-Truiden. At the end of the season, Angban picked up a total of 8 yellow cards and was sent off a total of 3 times.

Loan to Granada
On 22 July 2016, it was announced that Angban would be joining Spanish side Granada on loan for the season. He is the second Chelsea player to join Granada on loan, with the first being Jérémie Boga. On 16 September 2016, he made his debut in a 2–2 draw against Real Betis.

Loan to Waasland-Beveren
On 28 July 2017, it was announced that Angban would be joining Belgian side Waasland-Beveren on loan for the season.

Loan to Metz
In July 2018, it was announced that Angban would be joining FC Metz in French Ligue 2 on loan for the season.

Metz
In April 2019, it was revealed that Metz had exercised the promotion clause in Angban's contract, and he joined the club in a €6 million deal.

Sochi
On 3 July 2021, he joined Russian Premier League club Sochi.

International career
Angban has represented Ivory Coast at U17 level and scored at the 2015 African Under-20 Championship finals. On 2 October 2015, he received his first senior Ivory Coast call up by manager Michel Dussuyer as they took on Morocco in a friendly. He was named in the senior Ivory Coast squad for the 2019 Africa Cup of Nations.

Personal life
Angban's older brother, Vincent, is a former professional footballer who played as a goalkeeper.

Career statistics

Honours
Metz
Ligue 2: 2018–19

References

External links
 

1996 births
Living people
Footballers from Abidjan
Ivorian footballers
Ivorian expatriate footballers
Ivory Coast international footballers
Ivory Coast under-20 international footballers
Association football midfielders
Chelsea F.C. players
Sint-Truidense V.V. players
Granada CF footballers
S.K. Beveren players
FC Metz players
PFC Sochi players
Belgian Pro League players
La Liga players
Ligue 1 players
Ligue 2 players
Russian Premier League players
2017 Africa Cup of Nations players
2019 Africa Cup of Nations players
Expatriate footballers in Belgium
Expatriate footballers in Spain
Expatriate footballers in France
Expatriate footballers in Russia
Ivory Coast youth international footballers